Steffan may refer to:

Surname:
Dan Steffan, American cartoonist and writer
Johann Gottfried Steffan (1815–1905), Swiss landscapist
Joseph Anton Steffan (1726–1797), or Josef Antonín Štěpán, a composer originally from Bohemia
Joseph Steffan (born 1964), American lawyer and gay activist

Given name:
Steffan Cravos (born 1975), Welsh rap and hip hop artist
Steffan Danielsen (1922–1976), Faroese painter
Steffan Hughes English-born Welsh rugby league footballer
Steffan Jones (born 1974), Welsh cricketer who plays for Somerset
Steffan O'Sullivan, the author of several role-playing game books
Steffan Piolet (born 1988), English cricketer
Steffan Rhodri, Welsh film actor, who has also worked frequently in television
Steffan Sondermark Fallesen (born 1981), Internet entrepreneur
Steffan Tubbs, radio host on Denver, Colorado's KOA, host of Colorado's Morning News

See also
Stephen

nl:Steffan